A German invasion of Hungary took place in August–September 1063, interfering in a dynastic conflict in the Kingdom of Hungary. Solomon, assisted by his brother-in-law Henry IV of Germany, decided to return to Hungary in order to his restoration to the Hungarian throne against his usurper uncle Béla I. Prior to that, Henry IV refused Béla's proposals to conclude a peace treaty with the Holy Roman Empire. German troops invaded Hungary in August 1063. Béla died in an accident unexpectedly and the German army entered Székesfehérvár. Henry installed Solomon on the throne.

Background
After spending fifteen years in exile, Andrew I ascended the Hungarian throne during an extensive pagan revolt in 1046, defeating Peter Orseolo, a vassal of King Henry III of Germany. Andrew soon broke with his pagan supporters, restored Christianity and declared pagan rites illegal. He requested his younger brother Béla to return to Hungary in 1048, granting him one-third of the kingdom, with the title of duke. The two brothers closely collaborated in the subsequent years, successfully preventing the raids and invasions of the Holy Roman Empire along the western border in the early 1050s.

Andrew's son Solomon was born in 1053. The two brothers' good relationship deteriorated after King Andrew had the child Solomon crowned king in 1057 or 1058. The coronation was the consequence of the peace negotiations with the Holy Roman Empire, because the Germans did not acquiesce in a marriage between Solomon and Judith – sister of the minor Henry IV – until Solomon's right to succeed his father was declared and publicly confirmed. According to the Annales Altahenses, Béla and his eldest son Géza were absent from that meeting in September 1058, where Judith was engaged to Solomon. Thereafter Andrew I was determined to secure the throne for his son. The Illuminated Chronicle narrates that Andrew invited Béla to his manor in Várkony, where the King offered his brother a seemingly free choice between a crown and a sword (which were the symbols of the royal and ducal power, respectively). However, he had ordered that Béla be murdered if he chose the crown. Having been informed of his brother's secret plan by one of his own partisans in the royal court, Béla opted for the sword. Several historians argued the text regarding the meeting at Várkony originated in the 12th century, as kind of a retrospective justification for Béla's violent usurpation of the throne. Béla soon departed for Poland along with his partisans; he sought the assistance of Duke Boleslaus the Bold and returned with Polish reinforcements. Béla emerged the victor in the ensuing civil war, during which Andrew was mortally injured in a battle in the autumn of 1060. Béla I was crowned king on 6 December 1060, while the child Solomon and his mother fled to the Holy Roman Empire and settled in the fort of Melk. In early 1061, Anastasia traveled to Regensburg and sought assistance from Henry IV and his German court in order to recover the Hungarian throne for his minor son.

Béla I attempted to conclude a peace treaty with the Holy Roman Empire. For this purpose, shortly after his coronation, he released all German commanders – for instance, William, Margrave of Meissen – who had assisted Andrew during the civil war. However, the young German monarch's advisors refused Béla's proposals. The usurper could keep his throne for three years only because the attention of the imperial councilors under the regency of dowager queen Agnes of Poitou was drawn to the events of Italian foreign policy (the election reform of Pope Nicholas II). At the turn of 1062 and 1063, prelates Anno of Cologne then Adalbert of Bremen took over the office of regent. In the summer of 1063, an assembly of the German princes in Mainz decided to launch a military expedition against Hungary to install the young Solomon to the throne. The Annales Altahenses narrates that Béla even offered his son and heir Géza as hostage to the Germans when he was informed of the planned invasion.

The invasion

The imperial army invaded the Kingdom of Hungary in late August 1063. The German troops commanded by Otto of Nordheim, Duke of Bavaria, crossed the border sometime after 20 August 1063: Henry IV, who personally participated in the war, issued his royal charter in Erlangen on that day. It is presumable that the imperial army entered the territory of Hungary in the first days of September 1063. Historian Ágoston Ignácz considered the German army set out for Melk – where Anastasia, Solomon's mother was in exile – on their route along the river Danube towards to Hungary. On the western boundary, the Hungarians established a line of defense called gyepű in the early 11th century. Due to Hungarian assistance from Solomon's partisans, the imperial force this time easily crossed the natural frontier in a swampy area, according to the narration of the Annales Altahenses. From here the castle of Moson (present-day in Mosonmagyaróvár) in the namesake county was a two-day walk away, which was laid siege and captured by the vanguard and then the arriving main army corps.

Upon hearing the news of German invasion, Béla I was planning to abdicate in favor of his nephew if the latter restored his former ducatus, but he was seriously injured when "his throne broke beneath him" in his royal manor at Dömös. The dying king was taken to the western borders of his kingdom, where he died at the creek Kőris near the river Rabnitz (Répce) at Dévény Castle (present-day Devín, Slovakia) on 11 September 1063. Historian Péter Báling considered the narration of Béla's death as topos and allegory, comparing his death with the fate of Bishop Bruno of Würzburg. With this narration, the chronicler expressed that Béla had no legitimate claim to the Hungarian throne. It is conceivable that Béla I died in the fighting against the Germans in the western borderland. Historian Dániel Bagi argued the narration of Béla's accidental death is an allusion to the illegitim nature of his rule.

Contrary to the Annales Altahenses, Lambert of Hersfeld's Annales and the Illuminated Chronicle consider the German army invaded Hungary only after Béla's death. The imperial army marched into Central Hungary and entered Székesfehérvár without resistance, where they were given a triumphant welcome (adventus) by the secular and ecclesiastical elite. Béla's three sons – Géza, Ladislaus and Lampert – fled Hungary and sought refuge in Poland. The 10-year-old was ceremoniously "crowned king with the consent and acclamation of all Hungary" in September 1063, according to the Illuminated Chronicle, which also mentions that Henry IV "seated" Solomon "upon his father's throne", but did not require him to take an oath of fealty. As Solomon was previously crowned legitimately, the event was a combination of a "festival crowning and the Crown-wearing ritual", according to Slovak historian Dušan Zupka. Solomon's marriage with Henry IV's sister, Judith also took place on this occasion. The Annales Augustani (or "Annals of Augsburg") claims that Solomon submitted himself to the German king; all other sources refer to Solomon as an ally and not as a vassal of Henry IV.

The 13-year-old Henry IV gained his first military experience during this campaign. Therefore, the invasion proved to be an important milestone in the characterization of his rule in terms of Henry's "suitability to rule" (idoneitas) and in the narrower sense his "heroic warfare" (gesta militaria). Solomon and his mother Anastasia richly rewarded King Henry and the German military leadership. According to Lambert of Hersfeld's chronicle, Otto of Nordheim was granted a "sword of Attila" by the queen mother. Lambert narrates that a certain Liupold, one of the partisans of Otto, who had become a traitor and enemy of Henry IV by then, later accidentally killed himself with this sword in 1071. The relic, a 10th-century saber is displayed in Vienna. Bagi remained skeptical about the authenticity of the story: Lambert was considered an opponent of Henry IV during the Investiture Controversy and gifting a sword to Otto would have been a political symbol of power in the 11th century. In a short time, the imperial army decided to leave Hungary. Henry IV already issued his next known charter at the river Fischa on 27 September 1063.

Aftermath
Solomon's three cousins – Géza and his brothers – returned after the German troops had been withdrawn from Hungary. They arrived with Polish reinforcements and Solomon sought refuge in the fortress of Moson at the western border of his kingdom. The Hungarian prelates led by Archbishop Desiderius began to mediate between them in order to avoid a new civil war. Solomon and his cousins eventually reached an agreement, which was signed in Győr on 20 January 1064. Géza and his brothers acknowledged Solomon as lawful king, and Solomon granted them their father's one-time ducatus. Solomon and his cousins closely cooperated in the period between 1064 and 1071, but their relationship remained distrustful and tense which led to another state of war thereafter.

References

Sources

Primary sources

Secondary sources

 
 
 
 
 
 
 

1063 in Europe
Wars involving the Holy Roman Empire
Wars involving Hungary
Invasions by Germany
11th century in Hungary
Wars involving Bavaria
Conflicts in 1063
Wars of the Middle Ages